Cubic IDE is a modular development environment (IDE) for AmigaOS (versions 3.5 and 3.9 only) and MorphOS. Its central editor is GoldED 8, which supports file type centric configuration.

The specific features for developers include syntax highlighting for several programming languages (e.g. Hollywood), folding, a symbol browser, a project explorer, an installation assistant (to create installations), support for creating Rexx macros and autodoc documentation, makefile generation, dialogs to set compiler options, automatic completion of OS symbols and clickable compiler output (jump to error). Compiler integration is available for popular C/C++ compilers for the supported platforms: GCC, vbcc, SAS/C and StormC3. Several free compilers for AmigaOS3, PowerUP, WarpOS and MorphOS are included and integrated into the development environment.

External links 
 

Amiga development software
Integrated development environments
MorphOS software